Laccopterum is a genus of beetles in the family Carabidae, containing the following species:

 Laccopterum cyaneum (Fabricius, 1775)
 Laccopterum darwiniense (W. J. MacLeay, 1878)
 Laccopterum deauratum (W. J. MacLeay, 1864)
 Laccopterum doddi (Sloane, 1916)
 Laccopterum foveigerum (Chaudoir, 1868)
 Laccopterum foveipenne (W. J. MacLeay, 1873)
 Laccopterum foveolatum (W. J. MacLeay, 1864)
 Laccopterum gemmatum (Westwood, 1842)
 Laccopterum humerale Sloane, 1900
 Laccopterum lacunosum W. J. MacLeay, 1887
 Laccopterum loculosum (E. Newman, 1842)
 Laccopterum macleayi Sloane, 1897
 Laccopterum multiimpressum (Laporte, 1867)
 Laccopterum quadriseriatum (Sloane, 1907)
 Laccopterum salebrosum (W. J. MacLeay, 1871)
 Laccopterum spencei Westwood, 1841

References

Scaritinae